Béla Rákosi (born Béla Kremsner; 1841, Acsád, Kingdom of Hungary) was a Hungarian physician, surgeon doctor, and police surgeon. He was a relative of Jenő, Viktor, and Szidi Rákosi.

Life 
Rákosi was born in Acsád, where his father (who, in 1867, changed his family name to name Rákosi, children included) was the host Szeged officer. Rákosi studied medical sciences at Vienna University and earned a medical doctor degree in 1864. He was the County doctor in Gyergyószentmiklós, and was later the state physician in Vác and medical practitioner and police in Budapest and was a member of the Royal medical association in Budapest.

He wrote articles in the Jogtudományi Közlöny (held a class in Reading Prison Affairs), in medicine (1871 epidemic toroklob Gyergyó-Ditró), the plague, edited by István Toldy National Newsstand; Nemzeti Hírlap, the Reform (insane 1872 statistics), and the Budapesti Hírlap (medical ministries).

Works 
 A bűnügyi lélektan alapvonalai. A német birodalom büntető törvénykönyv alapjára fektetve orvosok és jogászok számára. Budapest, 1876.
 A betegápolás otthon és a kórházban. Kézikönyv családok és betegápolónők számára. Írta Billroth Tivadar, magyarra ford. ... U. ott, 1882.
 A természettani gyógyrendszerek tankönyve orvosok és orvostanulók számára. Irta Rossbach M. J., ford. .. U. ott, 1883. 85 fametszettel.
 A fegyintézeti élelmezés próbája súlymérések alapján. Feolvastatott a magyar jogászegylet börtönügyi bizottságának 1890. ápr. 16. ülésén. U. ott, 1891 (Magyar Jogászegyleti Értekezések VI. 5.).

Sources 
 Szinnyei József: Magyar írók élete és munkái.
 Oláh Gyula, Az egészségügyi személyzet Magyarországban. Budapest, 1876. 104. l.
 Századunk névváltoztatásai. Budapest, 1895. 186. l.
 Pesti Alfréd, Magyarország orvosainak Évkönyve. Bpest, 1899. 161. l.

19th-century Hungarian physicians
Hungarian surgeons
1841 births

Year of death missing
Danube-Swabian people